General Sturgis may refer to:

Samuel D. Sturgis (1822–1889), U.S. Army brevet major general
Samuel D. Sturgis Jr. (1861–1933) (1861–1933), U.S. Army major general
Samuel D. Sturgis III (1897–1964), U.S. Army lieutenant general

See also
Robert Sturges (1891–1970), Royal Marines lieutenant general